Krystal may refer to:

People 

 Krystal Ann Simpson (born 1982), American poet, fashion blogger, DJ, reality television personality, and musician
 Krystal Ball (born 1981), American political commentator
 Krystal Barter, Australian activist, author, and founder of Pink Hope
 Krystal Davis, American session musician and background singer
 Krystal de Ramos (born 1997), American-born Filipino footballer
 Krystal Fernandez (born 1971), American sports journalist
 Krystal Forgesson (born 1982), New Zealand field hockey player
 Krystal Forscutt (born 1986), Australian model
 Krystal Gabel (born 1984), American cannabis rights activist, politician, and writer
 Krystal Garib, Canadian Broadway performer, singer, dancer, filmmaker, producer, choreographer, philanthropist, and educator
 Krystal Harris (born 1981), American pop singer
 Krystal (Jamaican singer), who had a hit single "Twice My Age" 1989 with Shabba Ranks produced by Gussie Clarke
 Krystal Joy Brown (born 1988), American Broadway theater and television actress
 Krystal Jung (born 1994), Korean-American singer with the band f(x)
 Krystal Keith (born 1985), American country music singer
 Krystal Klear, Irish DJ and music producer
 Krystal Lara (born 1998), Dominican-American competitive swimmer
 Krystal Meyers, American Christian rock musician
 Krystal Muccioli (born 1989), American beauty pageant titleholder
 Krystal Murray (born 1993), New Zealand former rugby league player
 Krystal Niu or Red Panda (born 1970/1971), Chinese American acrobat
 Krystal Parker (born 1990), English footballer
 Krystal Reyes (born 1996), Filipina actress
 Krystal Rota (born 1985), New Zealand rugby league footballer
 Krystal Shaw (born 1994), Canadian Paralympic swimmer
 Krystal Sutherland (born 1990), Australian author
 Krystal Thomas (born 1989), American former basketball player
 Krystal Tsosie, Native American Navajo geneticist and bioethics
 Krystal Vee (born 1987), Thai actress, model, and producer
 Krystal Versace (born 2001), English drag queen
 Krystal Weir (born 1985), Australian sailor

Fictional characters 

 Krystal Bouchard, from Swamp Shark
 Krystal Carey, from the American soap opera All My Children
 Krystal, from the Japanese video game Dark Wizard
 Krystal, a video game character from the Star Fox series

Other 

 Krystal (film)
 Krystal (restaurant), one of the oldest fast-food chains in the United States, founded in 1932

See also 

 Cristal (disambiguation)
 Crystal (disambiguation)
 Kristal (disambiguation)
 Kristol